Scopelogadus is a genus of ridgeheads. The generic name derives from the Greek σκόπελος (skopelos, "lanternfish") and γάδος (gados, "(cod) fish").

Species
There are currently three recognized species in this genus:
 Scopelogadus beanii (Günther, 1887) (Bean's bigscale)
 Scopelogadus mizolepis (Günther, 1878)
 Scopelogadus mizolepis bispinosus (C. H. Gilbert, 1915) (Twospine bigscale)
 Scopelogadus mizolepis mizolepis (Günther, 1878) (Ragged bigscale)
 Scopelogadus perplexus Kotyar, 2021
 Scopelogadus unispinis Ebeling & W. H. Weed, 1963

References

Stephanoberyciformes